Thomas Lloyd may refer to:

Government
 Sir Thomas Lloyd, 1st Baronet (1820–1877), Welsh politician
 Thomas Lloyd (lieutenant governor) (1640–1694), Lieutenant Governor of Pennsylvania, 1684–1688
 Thomas Edward Lloyd (1820–1909), British Member of Parliament for Cardiganshire, 1874–1880
 Thomas Lloyd (Irish politician) (1716–1805), Irish politician
 Thomas Lloyd (1814–1890), British politician, member of parliament for Barnstaple
 Thomas Lloyd, Coedmore (1793–1857), landowner and Lord Lieutenant of Cardiganshire
 Thomas Ingram Kynaston Lloyd (1896–1968), British civil servant

Religion
 Thomas Lloyd (lexicographer) (c. 1673–1734), Welsh cleric and lexicographer
 Thomas Richard Lloyd (1820–1891), Welsh priest and bard
 Thomas Lloyd (bishop) (1857–1935), Welsh Anglican suffragan bishop
 Thomas Lloyd (priest) (1824–1896), Archdeacon of Salop

Others
 Thomas F. Lloyd (1841–1911), founder of Carrboro, North Carolina and mill owner
 Thomas Lloyd (stenographer) (1756–1827), published the Congressional Register, known as the "Father of American Shorthand"
 Thomas Lloyd (rugby union) (1882–1938), Welsh international rugby union forward
 Thomas Lloyd (cricketer), English cricketer
 Thomas Alwyn Lloyd (1881–1960), Welsh architect and town planner
 Thomas Lloyd (Dean of Bangor) (1709–1793)
 Thomas Lloyd (naval architect) (1803–1875), nineteenth century English naval architect and engineer

See also
Tom Lloyd (disambiguation)